The Macon Whoopee were a professional ice hockey team that played in the East Coast Hockey League (ECHL) during the 2001–02 season. Based in Macon, Georgia, the team played its home games at Macon Coliseum.

History
Prior to the 2001–02 ECHL season, the Tallahassee Tiger Sharks were moved from Tallahassee, Florida to Macon, Georgia to begin play as the Macon Whoopee. Coached by former NHL defenceman Gord Dineen, the team compiled a record of 29 wins, 31 losses, and 12 ties to finish out of the playoffs in their only season of play in Macon.

Following the 2001–02 season, the franchise was relocated to Lexington, Kentucky to play as the Lexington Men O' War.

References

 
2001 establishments in Georgia (U.S. state)
2002 disestablishments in Georgia (U.S. state)
Defunct ECHL teams
Defunct ice hockey teams in the United States
Ice hockey teams in Georgia (U.S. state)
Ice hockey clubs established in 2001
Ice hockey clubs disestablished in 2002
Sports in Macon, Georgia